Rasman bin Ithnain is a Malaysian politician from BERSATU. He was the Member of Johor State Legislative Assembly for Sedili from 2008 to 2022.

Politics 
On 12 May 2018, he quitted UMNO and joined BERSATU together with Alwiyah Talib and Rosleli Jahari, and he is now the Chief of BERSATU Kota Tinggi Branch. He is also a member of the Board of Directors of FELDA.

Election results

Controversies

Sexual harassment 
On 13 January 2022, a woman, aged 26 and daughter of former BERSATU Srikandi Chief, had lodged a report that Rasman had sexually harassed her. Rasman denied the allegations and said that it was a political conspiracy to tarnish his reputation.

References 

Malaysian United Indigenous Party politicians
Former United Malays National Organisation politicians
Members of the Johor State Legislative Assembly
Malaysian people of Malay descent
Living people
Year of birth missing (living people)